Flesh and Bullets is a 1985 crime film written, produced, edited and directed by Carlos Tobalina. It features Yvonne de Carlo, Aldo Ray, Cesar Romero, Cornel Wilde, Colleen Brennan, Bill Cable, and Robert Z'Dar in minor roles.

Cast
 Glenn McKay as Roy Hunter
 Gail Sterling as Gail Bordon (as Susan Silvers)
 Mic Morrow as Jeff Bordon
 Cydney Hill as Dolores Hunter
 Gina Tobalina as Dina
 Yvonne De Carlo as Judge in Los Angeles
 Aldo Ray as Lieutenant in Police Department
 Cesar Romero as Judge in Santa Monica
 Cornel Wilde as Captain of Police Department
 Colleen Brennan as Car Rental Agent (as Sharon Kelly)
 Bill Cable as Policeman
 Michael Demers as Bill
 Mike Andrew as Motorcycle Police Officer
 Maria Tobalina as Mrs. Wilson
 Robert Z'Dar as Don (as Robert West)

Reception
A contemporary review published in Variety called the film an "amateurish effort", and noted that its "plot, thesping, sets and camerawork have to struggle to come up to adequate level; mostly they hover below the line." Lee Pfeiffer of Cinema Retro wrote that it is "hard to recommend Flesh and Bullets as mainstream entertainment but, as a retro curiosity of a director's bold but failed attempt to break into the mainstream, it is certainly worth a look."

Home media
In 2015, the film was restored in 2K and released on DVD by Vinegar Syndrome.

References

External links
 
 Flesh and Bullets at TCMDB

1985 films
1980s crime films
1980s English-language films